Loshchinovsky is a rural locality (a khutor) in Iskrinskoye Rural Settlement, Uryupinsky District, Volgograd Oblast, Russia. The population was 432 as of 2010. There are 9 streets.

Geography 
Loshchinovsky is located in steppe, 53 km west of Uryupinsk (the district's administrative centre) by road. Rozovsky is the nearest rural locality.

References 

Rural localities in Uryupinsky District